José Pérez or Jose Perez may refer to:

Sportspeople

Association football
José Pérez (Uruguayan footballer) (1897-1920), Uruguayan footballer
José Ricardo Pérez (born 1963), Colombian football defender
José Andrés Pérez (born 1972), Mexican football manager and former player
José Manuel Pérez (footballer) (born 1985), Spanish footballer
José Pérez Ferrada (born 1985), Chilean footballer
José Pérez (Cuban footballer), (born 1999), Cuban footballer

Combat sports
José Luis Pérez (wrestler) (1925–1963), Mexican wrestler
José Pérez (pentathlete) (born 1928), Mexican Olympic modern pentathlete and fencer
José Miguel Pérez (fencer) (born 1938), Puerto Rican fencer
José Pérez (fencer) (born 1958), Spanish Olympic fencer
José Pérez (Venezuelan boxer) (born 1964), former Venezuelan boxer
José Pérez (judoka) (born 1965), Puerto Rican judoka
José Pérez Reyes (born 1975), boxer from the Dominican Republic

Other sports
Jose Perez (American football) (born 1985), American football player and former baseball player
José Pérez (baseball) (1898–?), Cuban baseball player
José Pérez (equestrian), Mexican Olympic equestrian
José Pérez (hurdler) (born 1971), Cuban hurdler
José Pérez (sailor) (born 1961), Olympic sailor
José Pérez (sport shooter) (born 1957), Spanish sports shooter
José Pérez (weightlifter) (born 1945), Dominican Republic Olympic weightlifter
José Pérez Francés (born 1936), Spanish road racing cyclist
José Pérez Llácer (1927–2006), Spanish racing cyclist
José Luis Pérez (equestrian) (born 1943), Mexican equestrian
José Manuel Pérez (bobsleigh) (born 1947), Spanish bobsledder
José Miguel Pérez (triathlete) (born 1986), Spanish triathlete

Others
Jose P. Perez (1946–2021), Filipino judge
Jose Perez (actor), (born 1940), American actor
José Pérez Adán (born 1952), Spanish sociologist
José Joaquín Pérez (1801–1889), Chilean political figure
José María Pérez de Urdininea (1784–1865), president of Bolivia
José Rico Pérez (1918–2010), Spanish businessman, chairman of the Spanish football club Hércules CF
José Pérez Rosa, Puerto Rican senator and politician

See also
Estadio José Alberto Pérez, a multi-use stadium in Valera, Venezuela